Chris Humfrey is an Australian zoologist and television personality. He has starred in the ABC3 documentary series Chris Humfrey's Wild Life, now on Viasat Nature, and the  Animal Planet series Chris Humfrey's Animal Instinct.

Humfrey also appeared as a reporter on Talk to the Animals.

References

Australian television personalities
Australian zoologists
Living people
Year of birth missing (living people)